In the English language, the word nigger is an ethnic slur used against black people, especially African Americans. Starting in the 1980s, references to nigger have been progressively replaced by the euphemism , notably in cases where nigger is mentioned but not directly used. In an instance of linguistic reappropriation, the term nigger is also used casually and fraternally among African Americans, most commonly in the form of nigga, whose spelling originated from the phonological system of African-American English.

The word nigger, then spelled in English neger or niger, appeared in the 16th century as an adaptation of French nègre, itself from Spanish negro. They go back to the Latin adjective niger ([ˈnɪɡɛr]), meaning "black". It was initially seen as a relatively neutral term, essentially synonymous with the English word negro. Rather than demonstrating a hostile meaning of the word itself, early attested uses during the Atlantic slave trade (16th–19th century) often conveyed a patronizing tone that reflects the underlying attitudes held towards black people by their white authors. Building up on these mildly disparaging social meanings, the word took on a derogatory connotation from the mid-18th century onward, to the extent that it had "degenerated into an overt slur" by the middle of the 19th century. Some authors kept on using the term in a neutral sense up until the later part of the 20th century, at which point the use of nigger became increasingly seen as controversial regardless of its context or intent. 

Because the word nigger has historically "wreaked symbolic violence, often accompanied by physical violence", it began to disappear from general popular culture from the second part of the 20th century onward, at the exception of cases derived from intra-group usage such as hip hop culture. The Merriam-Webster Online Dictionary describes the term as "perhaps the most offensive and inflammatory racial slur in English". The Oxford English Dictionary writes that "this word is one of the most controversial in English, and is liable to be considered offensive or taboo in almost all contexts (even when used as a self-description)". Intra-group usage has been criticized by some contemporary African-American authors, a group of them (the eradicationists) calling for the total abandonment of its usage (even under the variant nigga), which they see as contributing to the "construction of an identity founded on self-hate". In wider society, the inclusion of the word nigger in classic works of literature (as in Mark Twain's 1884 book The Adventures of Huckleberry Finn) and in more recent cultural productions (such as Quentin Tarantino's 1994 film Pulp Fiction) has sparked controversy and ongoing debate.

By extension of its derogatory connotation, the word nigger has also been historically used to designate "any person considered to be of low social status" (as in the expression white nigger) or "any person whose behaviour is regarded as reprehensible", and in other national contexts to refer to Aboriginal and Māori people. In some cases, with awareness of the word's offensive connotation, but without intention to cause offense, it can refer to a "a victim of prejudice likened to that endured by African Americans" (as in John Lennon's 1972 song "Woman Is the Nigger of the World").

Etymology and history

Early use 
The variants neger and negar derive from various Romance words for 'black', including the Spanish and Portuguese word  (black) and the now-pejorative French .

In its original English-language usage, nigger (also spelled niger) was a word for a dark-skinned individual. The earliest known published use of the term dates from 1574, in a work alluding to "the Nigers of Aethiop, bearing witnes". According to the Oxford English Dictionary, the first derogatory usage of the term nigger was recorded two centuries later, in 1775.

In the colonial America of 1619, John Rolfe used negars in describing the African slaves shipped to the Virginia colony. Later American English spellings, neger and neggar, prevailed in New York under the Dutch and in metropolitan Philadelphia's Moravian and Pennsylvania Dutch communities; the African Burial Ground in New York City originally was known by the Dutch name  (Cemetery of the Negro). An early occurrence of neger in American English dates from 1625 in Rhode Island. Lexicographer Noah Webster suggested the neger spelling in place of negro in his 1806 dictionary.

18th and 19th century United States 

During the late 18th and early 19th century, the word "nigger" also described an actual labor category, which African American laborers adopted for themselves as a social identity, and thus white people used the descriptor word as a distancing or derogatory epithet, as if "quoting black people" and their non-standard language. During the early 1800s to the late 1840s fur trade in the Western United States, the word was spelled "niggur", and is often recorded in the literature of the time. George Fredrick Ruxton used it in his "mountain man" lexicon, without pejorative connotation. "Niggur" was evidently similar to the modern use of "dude" or "guy". This passage from Ruxton's Life in the Far West illustrates the word in spoken form—the speaker here referring to himself: "Travler, marm, this niggur's no travler; I ar' a trapper, marm, a mountain-man, wagh!" It was not used as a term exclusively for blacks among mountain men during this period, as Indians, Mexicans, and Frenchmen and Anglos alike could be a "niggur". "The noun slipped back and forth from derogatory to endearing."

By 1859 the term was clearly used to offend, in an attack on abolitionist John Brown.

The term "colored" or "negro" became a respectful alternative. In 1851, the Boston Vigilance Committee, an abolitionist organization, posted warnings to the Colored People of Boston and vicinity. Writing in 1904, journalist Clifton Johnson documented the "opprobrious" character of the word nigger, emphasizing that it was chosen in the South precisely because it was more offensive than "colored" or "negro". By the turn of the century, "colored" had become sufficiently mainstream that it was chosen as the racial self-identifier for the National Association for the Advancement of Colored People (NAACP). In 2008 Carla Sims, its communications director, said "the term 'colored' is not derogatory, [the NAACP] chose the word 'colored' because it was the most positive description commonly used [in 1909, when the association was founded]. It's outdated and antiquated but not offensive."

Mark Twain, in the autobiographic book Life on the Mississippi (1883), used the term within quotes, indicating reported speech, but used the term "negro" when writing in his own narrative persona. Joseph Conrad published a novella in Britain with the title The Nigger of the "Narcissus" (1897); in the United States, it was released as The Children of the Sea: A Tale of the Forecastle; the original had been called "the ugliest conceivable title" in a British review and American reviewers understood the change as reflecting American "refinement" and "prudery."

20th century United States 
A style guide to British English usage, H. W. Fowler's A Dictionary of Modern English Usage, states in the first edition (1926) that applying the word nigger to "others than full or partial negroes" is "felt as an insult by the person described, & betrays in the speaker, if not deliberate insolence, at least a very arrogant inhumanity"; but the second edition (1965) states "N. has been described as 'the term that carries with it all the obloquy and contempt and rejection which whites have inflicted on blacks'". The quoted formula goes back to the writings of the American journalist Harold R. Isaacs, who used it in several writings between 1963 and 1975. Black characters in Nella Larsen's 1929 novel Passing view its use as offensive; one says "I'm really not such an idiot that I don't realize that if a man calls me a nigger, it's his fault the first time, but mine if he has the opportunity to do it again."

By the late 1960s, the social change brought about by the civil rights movement had legitimized the racial identity word Black as mainstream American English usage to denote black-skinned Americans of African ancestry. President Thomas Jefferson had used this word of his slaves in his Notes on the State of Virginia (1785), but "Black" had not been widely used until the later 20th century. (See Black Pride, and, in the context of worldwide anti-colonialism initiatives, Négritude.)

In the 1980s, the term "African American" was advanced analogously to the terms "German American" and "Irish American", and was adopted by major media outlets. Moreover, as a compound word, African American resembles the vogue word Afro-American, an early-1970s popular usage. Some Black Americans continue to use the word nigger, often spelled as nigga and niggah, without irony, either to neutralize the word's impact or as a sign of solidarity.

Usage
Surveys from 2006 showed that the American public widely perceived usage of the term to be wrong or unacceptable, but that nearly half of whites and two-thirds of blacks knew someone personally who referred to blacks by the term. Nearly one-third of whites and two-thirds of blacks said they had personally used the term within the last five years.

In names of people, places and things

Political use

"Niggers in the White House" was written in reaction to an October 1901 White House dinner hosted by Republican President Theodore Roosevelt, who had invited Booker T. Washington—an African-American presidential adviser—as a guest. The poem reappeared in 1929 after First Lady Lou Hoover, wife of President Herbert Hoover, invited Jessie De Priest, the wife of African-American congressman Oscar De Priest, to a tea for congressmen's wives at the White House. The identity of the author—who used the byline "unchained poet"—remains unknown.

In explaining his refusal to be conscripted to fight the Vietnam War (1955–75), professional boxer Muhammad Ali said, "No Vietcong ever called me nigger." Later, his modified answer was the title of a documentary, No Vietnamese Ever Called Me Nigger (1968), about the front-line lot of the U.S. Army Black soldier in combat in Vietnam. An Ali biographer reports that, when interviewed by Robert Lipsyte in 1966, the boxer actually said, "I ain't got no quarrel with them Viet Cong."

On February 28, 2007, the New York City Council symbolically banned the use of the word nigger; however, there is no penalty for using it. This formal resolution also requests excluding from Grammy Award consideration every song whose lyrics contain the word; however, Ron Roecker, vice president of communication for the Recording Academy, doubted it will have any effect on actual nominations.

The word can be invoked politically for effect. When Detroit mayor Kwame Kilpatrick came under intense scrutiny for his conduct in 2008, he deviated from an address to the city council, saying, "In the past 30 days, I've been called a nigger more than any time in my entire life." Opponents accused him of "playing the race card" to save his political life.

Cultural use

The implicit racism of the word nigger has generally rendered its use taboo. Magazines and newspapers typically do not use this word but instead print censored versions such as "n*gg*r", "n**ger", "n——" or "the N-word"; see below.

The use of nigger in older literature has become controversial because of the word's modern meaning as a racist insult. One of the most enduring controversies has been the word's use in Mark Twain's novel Adventures of Huckleberry Finn (1885). Huckleberry Finn was the fifth most challenged book during the 1990s, according to the American Library Association. The novel is written from the point of view, and largely in the language, of an uneducated white boy, who is drifting down the Mississippi River on a raft with an adult escaped slave, Jim. The word "nigger" is used (mostly about Jim) over 200 times. Twain's advocates note that the novel is composed in then-contemporary vernacular usage, not racist stereotype, because Jim, the black man, is a sympathetic character.

In 2011, a new edition published by NewSouth Books replaced the word "nigger" with "slave" and also removed the word "injun". The change was spearheaded by Twain scholar Alan Gribben in the hope of "countering the 'pre-emptive censorship that results from the book's being removed from school curricula over language concerns. The changes sparked outrage from critics Elon James, Alexandra Petri and Chris Meadows.

In his 1999 memoir All Souls, Irish-American Michael Patrick MacDonald describes how many white residents of the Old Colony Housing Project in South Boston used this meaning to degrade the people considered to be of lower status, whether white or black.

In an academic setting
The word's usage in literature has led to it being a point of discussion in university lectures as well. In 2008, Arizona State University English professor Neal A. Lester created what has been called "the first ever college-level class designed to explore the word 'nigger. Starting in the following decade, colleges struggled with attempts to teach material about the slur in a sensitive manner. In 2012, a sixth grade Chicago teacher Lincoln Brown was suspended after repeating the contents of a racially charged note being passed around in class. Brown later filed a federal civil rights lawsuit against the headmaster and the Chicago public schools. A New Orleans high school also experienced controversy in 2017. Such increased attention prompted Elizabeth Stordeur Pryor, the daughter of Richard Pryor and a professor at Smith College, to give a talk opining that the word was leading to a "social crisis" in higher education.

In addition to Smith College, Emory University, Augsburg University, Southern Connecticut State University, and Simpson College all suspended professors in 2019 over referring to the word "nigger" by name in classroom settings. In two other cases, a professor at Princeton decided to stop teaching a course on hate speech after students protested his utterance of "nigger" and a professor at DePaul had his law course cancelled after 80% of the enrolled students transferred out. Instead of pursuing disciplinary action, a student at the College of the Desert challenged his professor in a viral class presentation which argued that her use of the word in a lecture was not justified.

In the workplace
In 2018, the head of the media company Netflix, Reed Hastings, fired his chief communications officer, Jonathan Friedland, for using the word twice during internal discussions about sensitive words. In explaining why, Hastings wrote:

The following year, screenwriter Walter Mosley turned down a job after his human resources department took issue with him using the word to describe racism that he experienced as a black man.

While defending Laurie Sheck, a professor who was cleared of ethical violations for quoting I Am Not Your Negro by James Baldwin, John McWhorter wrote that efforts to condemn racist language by white Americans had undergone mission creep. Similar controversies outside the United States have occurred at the University of Western Ontario in Canada and the Madrid campus of Syracuse University. In June 2020, Canadian news host Wendy Mesley was suspended and replaced with a guest host after she attended a meeting on racial justice and, in the process of quoting a journalist, used "a word that no-one like me should ever use". In August 2020, BBC news, with the agreement of victim and family, mentioned the slur when reporting on a physical and verbal assault on the black NHS worker and musician K-Dogg. Within the week the BBC received over 18,600 complaints, the black radio host David Whitely resigned in protest, and the BBC apologized.

In 2021, in Tampa, Florida, a 27-year-old black employee at a Dunkin' Donuts punched a 77-year-old white customer after the customer had repeatedly called the employee a nigger. The customer fell to the floor and hit his head. Three days later, he died, having suffered a skull fracture and brain contusions. The employee was arrested, and charged with manslaughter. In a plea bargain, the employee pled guilty to felony battery, and was sentenced to two years of house arrest. In 2022, in explaining why the employee did not receive any jail time, Grayson Kamm, a spokesman for Hillsborough State Attorney Andrew Warren, said "Two of the primary factors were the aggressive approach the victim took toward the defendant and everyone working with the defendant, and that the victim repeatedly used possibly the most aggressive and offensive term in the English language."

Intra-group versus intergroup usage

Black listeners often react to the term differently, depending on whether it is used by white speakers or by Black speakers. In the former case, it is regularly understood as insensitive or insulting; in the latter, it may carry notes of in-group disparagement, and is often understood as neutral or affectionate, a possible instance of reappropriation.

In the Black community, nigger is often rendered as nigga. This usage has been popularized by the rap and hip-hop music cultures and is used as part of an in-group lexicon and speech. It is not necessarily derogatory and is often used to mean homie or friend.

Acceptance of intra-group usage of the word nigga is still debated, although it has established a foothold amongst younger generations. The NAACP denounces the use of both nigga and nigger. Usage of nigga by mixed-race individuals is still largely considered taboo, albeit not as inflammatory as nigger. As of 2001, trends indicated that usage of the term in intragroup settings is increasing even amongst white youth, due to the popularity of rap and hip hop culture. Linguist Keith Allan rejects the view that nigger is always a slur, arguing that it is also used as a marker of camaraderie and friendship, comparable to the British and Australian term "mate" or the American "buddy".

According to Arthur K. Spears in Diverse Issues in Higher Education, 2006:

Kevin Cato, meanwhile, observes:

Addressing the use of nigger by Black people, philosopher and public intellectual Cornel West said in 2007:

2010s: increase in use and controversy
In the 2010s, "nigger" in its various forms saw use with increasing frequency by African Americans amongst themselves or in self-expression, the most common swear word in hip hop music lyrics. Ta-Nehisi Coates suggested that it continues to be unacceptable for non-Blacks to utter while singing or rapping along to hip-hop, and that by being so restrained it gives white Americans (specifically) an impression of what it is like to not be entitled to "do anything they please, anywhere". A concern often raised is whether frequent exposure will inevitably lead to a dilution of the extremely negative perception of the word among the majority of non-Black Americans who currently consider its use unacceptable and shocking.

Related words

Derivatives

In several English-speaking countries, "Niggerhead" or "nigger head" was used as a name for many sorts of things, including commercial products, places, plants and animals, as a descriptive term (lit. 'Black person's head'). It also is or was a colloquial technical term in industry, mining, and seafaring. Nigger as "defect" (a hidden problem), derives from "nigger in the woodpile", a US slave-era phrase denoting escaped slaves hiding in train-transported woodpiles. In the 1840s, the Morning Chronicle newspaper report series London Labour and the London Poor, by Henry Mayhew, records the usages of both "nigger" and the similar-sounding word "niggard" denoting a false bottom for a grate.

In American English, "nigger lover" initially applied to abolitionists, then to white people sympathetic towards Black Americans. The portmanteau word wigger ('White' + 'nigger') denotes a white person emulating "street Black behavior", hoping to gain acceptance to the hip hop, thug, and gangsta sub-cultures. Norman Mailer wrote of the antecedents of this phenomenon in 1957 in his essay The White Negro.

The N-word euphemism

The euphemism the N-word became mainstream American English usage during the racially contentious O. J. Simpson murder case in 1995. Key prosecution witness Detective Mark Fuhrman, of the Los Angeles Police Department—who denied using racist language on duty—impeached himself with his prolific use of nigger in tape recordings about his police work. The recordings, by screenplay writer Laura McKinney, were from a 1985 research session wherein the detective assisted her with a screenplay about LAPD policewomen. Fuhrman excused his use of the word saying he used nigger in the context of his "bad cop" persona. Media personnel who reported on Fuhrman's testimony substituted the N-word for nigger.

Similar-sounding words
 (Latin for "black") occurs in Latinate scientific nomenclature and is the root word for some homophones of nigger; sellers of niger seed (used as bird feed), sometimes use the spelling Nyjer seed. The classical Latin pronunciation  sounds similar to the English , occurring in biologic and anatomic names, such as Hyoscyamus niger (black henbane), and even for animals that are in fact not black, such as Sciurus niger (fox squirrel).

The word niggardly (miserly) is etymologically unrelated to nigger, derived from the Old Norse word  (stingy) and the Middle English word . In the US, this word has been misinterpreted as related to nigger and taken as offensive. In January 1999, David Howard, a white Washington, D.C., city employee, was compelled to resign after using niggardly—in a financial context—while speaking with Black colleagues, who took umbrage. After reviewing the misunderstanding, Mayor Anthony A. Williams offered to reinstate Howard to his former position. Howard refused reinstatement but took a job elsewhere in the mayor's government.

Denotational extension

The denotations of nigger also include non-Black/non-White and other disadvantaged people. Some of these terms are self-chosen, to identify with the oppression and resistance of Black Americans; others are ethnic slurs used by outsiders.

Jerry Farber's 1967 essay collection, The Student as Nigger, used the word as a metaphor for what he saw as the role forced on students. Farber had been, at the time, frequently arrested as a civil rights activist while beginning his career as a literature professor.

In his 1968 autobiography White Niggers of America: The Precocious Autobiography of a Quebec "Terrorist", Pierre Vallières, a Front de libération du Québec leader, refers to the oppression of the Québécois people in North America.

In 1969, in the course of being interviewed by the British magazine Nova, artist Yoko Ono said "woman is the nigger of the world;" three years later, her husband, John Lennon, published the song of the same name—about the worldwide phenomenon of discrimination against women—which was socially and politically controversial to US sensibilities.

Sand nigger, an ethnic slur against Arabs, and timber nigger and prairie nigger, ethnic slurs against Native Americans, are examples of the racist extension of nigger upon other non-white peoples.

In 1978, singer Patti Smith used the word in "Rock N Roll Nigger".

In 1979, English singer Elvis Costello used the phrase white nigger in "Oliver's Army", a song describing the experiences of working-class soldiers in the British military forces on the "murder mile" (Belfast during The Troubles), where white nigger was a common British pejorative for Irish Catholics. Later, the producers of the British talent show Stars in Their Eyes forced a contestant to censor one of its lines, changing "all it takes is one itchy trigger – One more widow, one less white nigger" to "one less white figure".

Historian Eugene Genovese, noted for bringing a Marxist perspective to the study of power, class, and relations between planters and slaves in the South, uses the word pointedly in The World the Slaveholders Made (1988).

The editor of Green Egg, a magazine described in The Encyclopedia of American Religions as a significant periodical, published an essay entitled "Niggers of the New Age". This argued that Neo-Pagans were treated badly by other parts of the New Age movement.

Other languages
Other languages, particularly Romance languages, have words that sound similar to or share etymological roots with nigger but do not necessarily mean the same.  In some of these languages, the words refer to the color black in general and are not specifically used to refer to black people.  When used to refer to black people, these words have acquired varying degrees of offensiveness, ranging from completely neutral (as in Spanish negro) to highly racist (as in Finnish Neekeri).  Examples of related words in other languages include:

('little black one') can be amicably or offensively used.  is always pejorative.
 Finnish:  ('Negro/nigger'), as a loan word ('Neger') from the Swedish language appeared for the first time in a book published in 1771. The use of the Finnish equivalent ('neekeri') began in the late 19th century. Until the 1980s, it was commonly used and generally not yet considered derogatory, although a few instances of it being considered to be so have been documented since the 1950s; by the mid-1990s the word was considered racist, especially in the metropolitan area and among the younger population. It has since then usually been replaced by the metonym 'musta' ('Black [person]'). In a survey conducted in 2000, Finnish respondents considered the term 'Neekeri' to be among the most offensive of minority designations. 
French:  is now considered derogatory. Some white Frenchmen have the surname . The word can still be used as a synonym of "sweetheart" in some traditional Louisiana French creole songs.
German:  is dated and now considered offensive.
Haitian Creole:  is used for any man in general, regardless of skin color (like dude in American English). Haitian Creole derives predominantly from French.
The first one is the most historically attested and was the most commonly used until the 1960s as an equivalent of the English word "negro".
Russian: the word негр has been commonly used to describe Black people. It can also be used as a synonym for underpaid worker, "литературный негр" ('literaturny negr') means ghostwriter.  means a negro child. For example, the mystery novel And Then There Were None by Agatha Christie, originally called Ten Little Niggers, is known in Russia as Десять негритят. In the 16th and 17th centuries, the word  ('moor') was used to describe people with dark skin. Nowadays, a black person would often be described neutrally as "", literally "black-skinned". The word  ('black') is often used as a derogatory word for peoples of the Caucasus and, less often, Black people.
Spanish:  is the word for "black" and is the only way to refer to that color.

See also
List of ethnic slurs
List of ethnic group names used as insults
Kaffir (ethnic slur)
Blackfella
Guilty or Innocent of Using the N Word, a 2006 documentary
List of topics related to Black and African people
"With Apologies to Jesse Jackson", an episode of South Park with a plot revolving around the word's extreme offensiveness
Golliwog

Notes

References

Sources

Further reading

1775 neologisms
African-American-related controversies
African-American society
American English words
Anti-African and anti-black slurs
Anti-black racism
English profanity
English words